Bonne Femme may refer to:

 Bonne Femme Creek (disambiguation)
 Bonne Femme Township, Howard County, Missouri, an inactive township

See also
 Les Bonnes Femmes, a 1960 French comedic drama film directed by Claude Chabrol